Schrock or Schröck is a surname. Notable people with the surname include:

Richard R. Schrock, professor at MIT and winner of the Nobel Prize in Chemistry in 2005
Schrock carbene, a chemical group named after the above
Ed Schrock, American politician from Virginia
Ed Schrock (Nebraska politician), American politician from Nebraska
Max Schrock, American baseball player
Raymond L. Schrock, American screenwriter
Stephan Schröck, German-Filipino footballer

See also
Schrock Airport, an airport in Oregon